Eivind Tverbak (April 1897, in Sørfold, Salten – 1982) was a Norwegian novelist and children's writer from Sørfold. He wrote several novels from fishermen's life in Northern Norway. He has also written books for children. He was awarded the Gyldendal's Endowment in 1957.

References

1897 births
1982 deaths
People from Sørfold
Norwegian children's writers
20th-century Norwegian novelists